Board of Equalization may refer to:

 California State Board of Equalization
 Oklahoma State Board of Equalization